Mock olive is a common name for several plants and may refer to:

 Large mock-olive
 Privet mock olive
 Veined mock olive

See also
 Mock (disambiguation)
 Olive (disambiguation)